Ju Lian (1828–1904), a native of Panyu (番禺, now Guangzhou, was a Chinese painter in Qing Dynasty.  His courtesy name was 'Ancient Spring' (Gu Quan 古泉), and self-given pseudonym  'Old Man of the Divided Mountain' (Ge Shan Lao Ren 隔山老人).  He was the younger brother (or cousin) of the painter Ju Chao. He was known for his bird-and-flower paintings as well as people and plant-and-insect paintings. He was the teacher of the brothers Gao Jianfu and Gao Qifeng.

Notes

References
 Ci hai bian ji wei yuan hui (辞海编辑委员会). Ci hai (辞海). Shanghai: Shanghai ci shu chu ban she (上海辞书出版社), 1979.
 Barnhart, R. M. et al. (1997). Three thousand years of Chinese painting. New Haven, Yale University Press.

External links

Qing dynasty painters
1828 births
1904 deaths
Artists from Guangzhou
People from Panyu District
Painters from Guangdong
19th-century Chinese painters